Masergy Communications is a software defined networking services company founded in 2000 and headquartered in Plano, Texas. Their offerings include Managed SD-WAN, Unified Communications, Cloud Contact Center, and Managed Security. Masergy was acquired by Comcast on October 8, 2021.

Masergy's customers include Huisman, Pattonair, PRGX, Inc., Eurostar, Dolby Laboratories, and the Hallmark Channel.

Corporate structure

Acquisitions and Subsidiaries
Chris MacFarland joined Masergy as its chief operating officer in 2008, and was named its CEO in 2010. In August 2011, Masergy was acquired by ABRY Partners LLC, a private equity investment firm, for an undisclosed price.
 
Masergy acquired Broadcore Communications for an undisclosed purchase price in July 2012. Broadcore offered communications services, including video calling and call recording, for businesses.

In April 2014, Masergy acquired Global DataGuard, broadening its portfolio to include managed security services for enterprise customers. Its Unified Enterprise Security solution includes advanced persistent threat management and adaptive network behavioral analysis.

Masergy was acquired by Berkshire Partners in 2016 for an undisclosed amount, and had been previously acquired by ABRY Partners LLC, a private equity investment firm, for an undisclosed price.

In September 2018, James Parker was named the new CEO.

In May 2020, Chris MacFarland was named the new Chairman & CEO.

In August 2021, Masergy Communications was acquired by Comcast Business.

Services
Masergy delivers Managed SD-WAN, Unified Communications, Cloud Contact Center, and Managed Security to global enterprises for clients in industries such as manufacturing, healthcare, entertainment, finance, broadcasting, and more.

In March 2019, Masergy launched its new AI-Powered Intelligent Virtual Agent which powers Masergy's virtual assistant and chat bot features for their Global UCaaS solutions.

In July 2019, Masergy launched its Integrated SD-WAN and Security Bundles, including options for Unified Threat Management, Threat Monitoring and Response as well as Managed Security Services.

In August 2019, Masergy launched an updated experience for its Intelligent Service Control (ISC) portal, simplifying and unifying network & application management.

In September 2019, Masergy announced the introduction of AIOps, the Industry’s First Integrated AI-based Network, Security & Application Optimization Solution, taking the first step towards their vision of autonomous networking.

In April 2020, Masergy Delivered their 2020 CCaaS and UCaaS Trends Report.

In July 2020,  Masergy announced its Zenith Partner Program, enhanced its service level agreements, and an expanded its SD-WAN portfolio for more service flexibility.

In August 2020, Masergy expands its SD-WAN portfolio offering the broadest choice, flexibility, and built-in SASE. The new portfolio, based on Gartner’s Secure Access Service Edge (SASE) tenets, is designed with the flexibility in network, access, management, and security providing businesses with many cloud and network configuration options.

References

Software companies based in Texas
Networking software companies
Companies based in Plano, Texas
Defunct software companies of the United States